The Texas Film Hall of Fame honors Texans who have made a significant contribution to film or filmmaking, as well as non-Texans who have made significant strides in the advancement of the Texan film industry. Classic Texas films are also honored, with a member of the cast or crew accepting on behalf of their colleagues. New inductees are announced at the annual Texas Film Awards, organised by the Austin Film Society.

The Hall of Fame and associated awards ceremony were co-founded in 2001 by Louis Black, the editor of the Austin Chronicle, and Evan Smith, Editor-In-Chief and CEO of The Texas Tribune and former editor of Texas Monthly.

Awards gala
For its first 11 years, the gala celebration was held at Austin Studios, the site of the city's onetime municipal airport, now converted into film production studios. In 2012, the Awards were held in downtown Austin at ACL Live at The Moody Theater. From 2013 to 2017 the awards were once again held at Austin Studios, before moving to the newly-opened AFS Cinema in 2018. 

From 2002 to 2005 the gala was emceed by Ann Richards, the former governor of Texas, who died on September 13, 2006. The 2007 gala commemorated her death by celebrating her life and her passion for film, emceed by New York columnist and 2001 inductee Liz Smith. Other galas have been emceed by Turk Pipkin, Evan Smith, Dan Rather, Thomas Haden Church, Wyatt Cenac, Anjelah Johnson, Dana Wheeler-Nicholson, Luke Wilson, Mike Judge and Louis Black.

The 2003 ceremony included a tribute to Eagle Pennell, presented by Kit Carson. In 2016 Variety Executive Editor Steven Gaydos and the Austin Film Society’s Founder and Artistic Director Richard Linklater presented a tribute to mark the AFS's 30th anniversary.

As well as inducting new members to the Hall of Fame, the awards ceremonies include various other presentations. The specific awards presented differs each year, but common ones include the Rising Star Award, the Honorary Texan Award and the Ann Richards Award. The Warren Skaaren Lifetime Achievement Award has been presented on three occasions:  Mike Simpson (2001), Jack Valenti (2002) and Michael Nesmith (2010).

Film awards
Between 2002 and 2015 each ceremony also honored a classic Texan film, initially with the Frontier Award and later by the Star of Texas and Creative Impact in Cinema awards. These awards were accepted by one or more members of the film's cast or crew.
 2002: Giant  (accepted by Dennis Hopper)
 2003: Easy Rider (accepted by Peter Fonda)
 2004: The Getaway (accepted by Ali MacGraw)
 2005: Written on the Wind  (accepted by Lauren Bacall)
 2006: The Last Picture Show  (accepted by Cybill Shepherd)
 2007: State Fair (accepted by Ann-Margret)
 2008: Urban Cowboy (accepted by Debra Winger)
 2009: Rushmore (accepted by Luke Wilson)
 2010: Waiting for Guffman (accepted by Catherine O'Hara)
 2011: Friday Night Lights (accepted by Connie Britton and Kyle Chandler with Ernest James, Brad Leland, Jesse Plemons, Scott Porter and Dana Wheeler-Nicholson)
 2012: Rio Bravo (accepted by Angie Dickinson)
 2013: Dazed and Confused (accepted by Parker Posey and Richard Linklater)
 2014: From Dusk Till Dawn (accepted by Robert Rodriguez, Fred Williamson, Tom Savini, Greg Nicotero and Danny Trejo)
 2015: Boyhood (accepted by director Richard Linklater and stars Patricia Arquette and Ellar Coltrane)

List of Hall of Fame members
Each ceremony includes the induction of several new members to the Texas Film Hall of Fame.
2001
 Robert Benton (presented by Anne Rapp)
 Liz Smith (presented by Ann Richards)
 Sissy Spacek (presented by Rip Torn)
 William D. Wittliff (presented by Barbara Morgan)
2002
 William Broyles Jr. (presented by Bill Wittliff)
 Cyd Charisse (presented by Peter Bogdanovich)
 Terrence Malick (presented by Sissy Spacek)
 Willie Nelson (presented by Lyle Lovett and Billy Gibbons)
2003
 Farrah Fawcett (presented by Dabney Coleman)
 Horton Foote (presented by Tess Harper)
 Woody Harrelson (presented by Matthew McConaughey)
 Tobe Hooper (presented by William Friedkin)
2004
 Ethan Hawke (presented by Richard Linklater)
 Judith Ivey (presented by Treat Williams)
 Edwin "Bud" Shrake (presented by Dennis Hopper)
 Forest Whitaker (presented by Jonathan Demme)
2005
 Irma P. Hall (presented by Joel Coen and Ethan Coen)
 Marcia Gay Harden (presented by Joe Pantoliano)
 Dennis Quaid (presented by Billy Bob Thornton)
2006
 Kris Kristofferson (presented by John Sayles)
 Matthew McConaughey (presented by S.R. Bindler)
 JoBeth Williams (presented by Lawrence Kasdan)
2007
 Richard Linklater (presented by John Sloss)
 Bill Paxton (presented by Stephen Bruton)
 Betty Buckley (presented by Phyllis George)
2008
 Morgan Fairchild (presented by Tess Harper)
2009
 Larry Hagman (presented by Linda Gray)
 Powers Boothe (presented by Keith Carradine)
2010
 Lukas Haas (presented by Lyle Lovett)
 Bruce McGill (presented by Tim Matheson)
2011
 Rip Torn
 Renée Zellweger (presented by Liz Smith)
2012
 Barry Corbin (presented by G.W. Bailey)
 Douglas McGrath (presented by Caroline Rhea)
 Meat Loaf (presented by Brett Cullen)
2013
 Stephen Tobolowsky (presented by Julie Hagerty)
 Robin Wright (presented by Rob Reiner)
 Annette O'Toole (presented by Michael McKean)
 Henry Thomas (presented by Sissy Spacek and Jack Fisk)
2014
 Mac Davis (presented by Priscilla Presley)
 Amber Heard (presented by Ryan Kavanaugh) 
 David Gordon Green (presented by Danny McBride) 
 Louis Black (presented by Richard Linklater and Steven Gaydos) 
2015
 Tommy Lee Jones (presented by Bill Wittliff)
 Bonnie Curtis (presented by Jess Weixler) 
 Guillermo del Toro (presented by Robert Rodriguez) 
 Luke Wilson (accepted by Charles Attal) 
 L.M. Kit Carson (posthumous) (presented by Louis Black) 
 Christopher Evan Welch (posthumous) (presented by Mike Judge)
2016
 Carol Burnett (presented by Maya Rudolph)
 Chandra Wilson (presented by Ellia English)
2017
 Shirley MacLaine (presented by Richard Linklater)
 Jeff Nichols (presented by Michael Shannon)
 Sarah Green (presented by Nick Kroll)
 Bill Paxton  (posthumous tribute)
 Debbie Reynolds (posthumous tribute) 
2018
 John McCall (presented by Kinky Friedman)
2019
 John Lee Hancock (presented by (Kathy Bates)

Other awards

Legacy Award
 2002: Gilbert Roland (presented by Cheech Marin)
 2003: Dooley Wilson (presented by Anna Deavere Smith)
 2008: Jayne Mansfield (accepted by Mariska Hargitay)

Rising Star Award
 2003: Owen Wilson (presented by Luke Wilson)
 2005: Robert Rodriguez (presented by George Lopez)
 2011: John Hawkes
 2016: Jesse Plemons (presented by Adrianne Palicki)
 2017: Tye Sheridan (presented by David Gordon Green)
 2019: Brooklyn Decker (presented by June Diane Raphael)

Honorary Texan Award
 2004: Robert Duvall (presented by Elvis Mitchell)
 2009: Billy Bob Thornton (presented by Dennis Quaid)
 2010: Quentin Tarantino (presented by Richard Linklater)
 2012: Danny Trejo (presented by Robert Rodriguez)

AMD Live! Soundtrack Award
 2006: Lyle Lovett (presented by Anne Rapp and Charlie Boswell of AMD)
 2007: Soundtrack Award: The Dixie Chicks (presented by Lance Armstrong)
 2008: ZZ Top (presented by Luke Wilson)

Ann Richards Award
 2007: Elizabeth Avellan
 2008: Mike Judge
 2009: Catherine Hardwicke (presented by Brendan Fraser)

Champion of the Arts
 2016: Michael Barker (presented by Ethan Hawke)
 2017: Hector Galán (presented by Henry Cisneros)

Jonathan Demme Award
 2018: Paul Thomas Anderson presented by Richard Linklater

Variety One to Acclaim Award
 2018: Armie Hammer presented by Timothée Chalamet

Star of Texas Award
 2019: Office Space 20th Anniversary Reunion with director Mike Judge and cast including Gary Cole, David Herman, and Ajay Naidu

Sponsored films 

 Vallam Kali
 Shark Cowboys
 On Dying of Dementia in a Capitalist System
 A Strike And an Uprising
 Also Starring Austin
 South of Marfa
 Bagatelle
 Born With It
 Building The American Dream
 Come And Take It: The Jessica Jin Story
 Event of the Season
 Women in Film and Television - Austin
 Experimental Response Cinema
 Good 'Ol Girl
 I'm Gonna Make You Love Me
 Raising Aniya
 The Incident at the Bellwood Schoolhouse
 Call her Ganda
 Becoming Leslie
 Living Springs
 Good Night Blues: The Donn's Depot Story
 Major
 Fighting Fair
 100 Ways to Catch the Wind
 Porvenir, Texas
 Foxy Trot
 Seadrift
 Seekers
 The Sensitives
 Caballerango
 Speak For Me
 Stumped
 Untitled Israeli Football Project
 Vinyl Generation
 When We Were Live

References

External links
Texas Film Hall of Fame
Austin Film Society

American film awards
Film organizations in the United States
Halls of fame in Texas
State halls of fame in the United States
Culture of Austin, Texas
Entertainment halls of fame